Glenn Heights is a city in Dallas and Ellis counties in the U.S. state of Texas. The population was 11,278 at the 2010 census, and 15,819 in 2020.

History
Development of the community dates back to the late 1960s. N.L. 'Moe' Craddock, a Dallas firefighter, opened a  mobile home park in the area. He helped push for the incorporation of Glenn Heights to prevent his business from being annexed by the city of DeSoto. The town was officially incorporated on September 16, 1969. Mr. Craddock remained active in Glenn Heights politics, serving on the city council during the 1970s and 1980s. He was appointed mayor in 1985 and was elected to that office in 1988, 1990, and 1992.

There were 257 residents living in Glenn Heights at the 1970 census. That figure rose to 1,033 in 1980 and more than doubled for a second consecutive decade to 4,564 by 1990.  Lying in the path of suburban sprawl, Glenn Heights' population had surpassed 7,000 by 2000. Despite its rapid rate of growth, more than 50 percent of city land remains undeveloped.

Geography

Glenn Heights is located at  (32.548198, –96.851430).

Demographics

As of the 2020 United States census, there were 15,819 people, 4,019 households, and 3,105 families residing in the city.

Education
The Dallas County portion of Glenn Heights is served by the DeSoto Independent School District, while the Ellis County portion is served by the Red Oak Independent School District.

The Dallas County portion is zoned to either Frank D. Moates Elementary School (west of Uhl Rd.) or Woodridge Elementary School (east of Uhl Rd.), Curtistene S. McCowan Middle School, and DeSoto High School.

The Ellis County portion is zoned to Donald T. Shields Elementary School, Red Oak Intermediate School, Red Oak Junior High School, and Red Oak High School.

All of Dallas County (its portion of Glenn Heights included) is in the service area of Dallas College (formerly Dallas County Community College). All of Ellis County (its portion of Glenn Heights included) is in the service area of Navarro College.

Transportation
Glenn Heights is the only suburb (except for Cockrell Hill, which is technically an enclave and not a suburb) in the southern half of Dallas County that is a member of Dallas Area Rapid Transit; it has been since DART's inception in 1983.  The Glenn Heights Park & Ride Center serves the city.  None of DART's current commuter rail lines serve Glenn Heights, nor will any of its proposed extensions.

References

External links
 City of Glenn Heights official website
 Glenn Heights Fire Department

Dallas–Fort Worth metroplex
Cities in Texas
Cities in Dallas County, Texas
Cities in Ellis County, Texas
Populated places established in 1969